Assistant Secretary of the United States Senate represents the position of Secretary of the United States Senate within the United States Senate during the absence of the Secretary.

The Secretary of the United States Senate was authorized to hire one principal clerk in 1789. This principal clerk, or chief clerk, for many years served primarily as a reading clerk on the Senate floor. During the 1960s, in response to the secretary's growing administrative duties, principal clerk or clerk became Assistant Secretary of the Senate. The assistant secretary oversees the administration of the 26 departments within the Office of the Secretary. and performs the functions of the secretary in his or her absence.

The Assistant Secretary performs all duties of Secretary of the Senate as well as that of Acting President pro tempore if absent and as outlined in Standing Rules of the United States Senate, Rule I.

External links
Office of Secretary of the Senate

United States Senate